Mental toughness is a measure of individual resilience and confidence that may predict success in sport, education and the workplace. As a broad concept, it emerged in the context of sports training, in the context of a set of attributes that allow a person to become a better athlete and able to cope with difficult training and difficult competitive situations and emerge without losing confidence. In recent decades, the term has been commonly used by coaches, sport psychologists, sports commentators, and business leaders.

Mental toughness and positivity are essential for someone to be successful in life. Whether this is in sports or in the workplace, an individual cannot fold under pressure if they want to thrive in life. When times get hard they have to stay positive and know that if they work hard enough the outcome they are desiring will most likely occur if they can be mentally tough and push through the hard times. This especially applies to sports and athletes, when times get tough you have to keep grinding and do everything in your power to comeback and win the game. An elite athlete must be able to handle pressure, have self-belief and avoid lifestyle distractions. This skill of mental toughness is easiest to learn as a child or during adolescence. The sooner one learns how to mentally tough the easier sports and life will become. Mental toughness is very much applied in sports, but it is also needed for everything done in life. One has to learn how to fight through adversity and not get down on themselves or give up when life gets difficult.They must have that urge to win and know that they have all the capabilities to do anything they desire. This separates good athletes from the elite athletes (Jones et al.,2002).

Samples of attributes were taken by Graham Jones to examine differences of success between athletes and which ones possess a strong mentality. It was proven that there were 30 attributes suggesting mental toughness in super elite athlete but only an average of 12 in elite athletes indicating the mental difference to become a super elite performer (Jones et al.,2007). This illustrates how important a positive mentality is for athletes to be successful.

Definition 
"Mental toughness" is frequently used colloquially to refer to any set of positive attributes that helps a person to cope with difficult situations. Coaches and sport commentators freely use the term mental toughness to describe the mental state of athletes who persevere through difficult sport circumstances to succeed. In support of this, a number of studies have linked mental toughness to sporting success or achievement. However, it is often simply applied as a default explanation for any victory, which is highly problematic as an attribution. Criticisms about the use of this imprecise approach abound (for example, Moran (2012)).

However, within the past 15 years, scientific research has attempted a formal definition of mental toughness as a psychological construct with clear measurement criteria, allowing robust analyses and comparisons to be made. Mental toughness has been recognized much more in the past decade, because of the impact of performance. An athlete cannot succeed to the best of their ability without being mentally tough.

In particular, three research teams have produced both a definition and a construct definition for mental toughness: The idea of being able to push past failures or blockades by remaining positive and competitive. This process involves training the mind to be ready for these circumstances and to be mentally ready for whatever challenges are to come in ones life.

Jones, Hanton, and Connaughton 

Graham Jones, Sheldon Hanton, and Declan Connaughton of the United States used personal construct psychology in interviews with elite athletes, as well as elite-level coaches and sport psychologists, to arrive at the following definition of mental toughness:

 Mental toughness is "Having the natural or developed psychological edge that enables you to: generally, cope better than your opponents with the many demands (competition, training, lifestyle) that sport places on a performer; specifically, be more consistent and better than your opponents in remaining determined, focused, confident, and in control under pressure." (Jones, Hanton, & Connaughton, 2002, p. 209).

These same researchers published a second paper in 2007, which provided four dimensions (categories) for mental toughness attributes. One general dimension was outlined: a performer's attitude or mindset (specifically, the performer's focus and self-belief). Three time-specific dimensions were outlined: training, competition, and post-competition. These time-specific dimensions contain attributes of mental toughness  (such as handling pressure, handling failure and pushing yourself to your physical limit in training) that pertain to their use at these times.

Clough and Earle 

Peter Clough et al. (2002)  proposed a model of mental toughness, conceptualising it more like a personality trait. Their model has four components: confidence; challenge; control and commitment. In initially conceptualising mental toughness and developing the MTQ48 questionnaire measurement tool, the approach taken by Clough et al. (2002) was to combine existing psychological theory and applied sport psychology in an attempt to bridge the gap between research and practice. Clough et al. saw clear comparisons between their emerging mental toughness data and the concept of hardiness, a key individual difference and resistance resource that helps buffer stress and has become an accepted concept in health psychology within the study of the stress-illness relationship. Clough et al. are clear that mental toughness is concept with broad application and should not be limited to the sports domain. They feel that sports specific measures are unlikely to move the field forward in any meaningful ways.  The development work relating to their model is fully described and discussed in their book on mental toughness.

Gucciardi, Gordon, and Dimmock 

Daniel Gucciardi, Sandy Gordon, and James Dimmock of Australia have proposed a different definition and framework of mental toughness, based primarily on their work with Australian footballers. Using personal construct psychology, these authors proposed the following definition of mental toughness:

Although this definition was produced through work with Australian footballers, it has been generalized to other sports, including cricket and soccer. This definition conceives of mental toughness as having both reactive and proactive qualities, meaning that mentally tough players can use mental toughness attributes to help endure and perform well during adverse situations, but can also employ other attributes of mental toughness when the game is going well, to keep them playing at their best.

Studies 

Some psychologists have argued that a separate, sport-specific definitions of mental toughness should be developed. They have highlighted that the attributes of a mentally tough athlete in one sport may differ greatly from the attributes of a mentally tough athlete in a different sport. Differences have been hypothesized between male and female athletes, as well as between "team sport" and "individual sport" athletes, but to date, little empirical evidence has shown what these differences are.

Sport-specific studies of mental toughness have been conducted in cricket, soccer, gymnastics, and Australian football. 
 
 
 
 
These studies have not employed a common framework, although many have used the definition of mental toughness provided by either the Jones et al. study, or the Gucciardi et al. study.

Many sports focused studies have employed the Clough model of mental toughness.  They have, using samples of athletes, shown a link between toughness, coping, emotional reactivity, psychological skills and performance.

One of the few published studies that takes mental toughness out of the sporting domain is based on the 4 'C's model. In this study it was shown that senior managers are tougher than their junior colleagues. Clough and his team are working in a number of areas outside of sport – education, health, social as well as occupational to explore the relevance of mental toughness in these areas.

In 2019, a study using a personality assessment identified six personality traits of top Division 1 and professional athletes that define mental toughness. This study also highlighted that the traits that make up mental toughness and predict athletic success are some of the same traits seen in the most successful sale professionals.

In April 2020, researchers found that top gamers shared the same mental toughness as olympian athletes.

Developmental studies 
There is an active debate about whether mental toughness is primarily a developed characteristic, or has  a genetic basis. Two studies  suggest that foundational processes occur during development that allow a person to build mental toughness throughout life. For instance, a study of American soccer players, parents, and coaches found that parents provide a "generalized form" of mental toughness upon which coaches can build a sport-specific form of mental toughness. A similar study suggested that mental toughness development proceeds first through the development of a tough attitude (strong focus and strong self-belief); upon a tough attitude, an athlete learns how to develop mental toughness attributes needed for training, then for competition. Another study examined the developmental experiences of ten super-elite athletes and found that coaches and significant adults played an important role in mental toughness development through all stages of talent development. Mental toughness can be influenced by having mentally tough parents, but ultimately to master the skill it must be taught. It takes years and a lot of experience to ever master, but truly no one will ever master mental toughness. At some point you can eventually break someone from their mental state. We can only try to become as mentally tough as we humanly can be.

Conversely, the work of Horsburgh et al. (2009) demonstrates that genetic and non-shared environmental factors contribute to the development of mental toughness (as measured by the MTQ48), and that mental toughness behaves "in the same manner as virtually every personality trait that has ever been investigated in behavioural genetic study". In establishing significant relationships with the big five personality factors of Costa and McCrae (1992), these researchers have also provided evidence to support Clough et al.’s conceptualisation of mental toughness. Whilst clearly embracing the importance of genetics, Clough clearly acknowledges that mental toughness can be developed.

Studies with Sports 
A research study was conducted to analyze and see how kids with mental toughness performed compared to those without it. Out of a random groupings of people the researchers found that the mentally tough athletes were well better off in their sport. There were 5 reoccurring themes with the athletes that possed mental toughness. First off the athletes proved and showed their mental toughness by overcoming obstacles and not getting down on themselves when things did not go their way. Second the athletes who were mentally tough were much more self driven to do well in their given sport and were self determined. Third the mentally tough were able to control their emotions while playing the sport. This is a very good skill to posses because emotions can sometimes get the best of you when playing a sport. Fourth the mentally tough focus on ways to become better at their sport in ways where they do not get all the glory. They will do things that help their team win that most people may not notice such as giving an assist in Basketball. Lastly mentally tough athletes are good teammates, they are not selfish. They will do whatever it takes to win, whether that is them grinding it out every play while someone else gets all the glory by scoring the baskets. They do not care about the glory they just do whatever it takes for their given team to succeed.

Similar constructs 
Mental toughness has been equated with better understood constructs from psychology such as resilience and hardiness. The term resilience is often incorrectly used interchangeably with mental toughness, and researchers have found the two constructs are positively associated with one another. However, psychologists define resilience as a positive adaptive process of coping with stress and adversity, as opposed to a collection of psychological attributes or personality traits. Hardiness has been suggested as a similar construct to mental toughness. Hardiness has typically been constructed as a personality trait, which is generally seen as stable throughout the lifetime. This differs from the conceptions of mental toughness offered by both Jones et al. and Gucciardi et al. These authors both conceive of mental toughness as unstable, arising in development, fluctuating over time, and varying for an individual performer between different sport and life scenarios. This definitional dilemma plagues the use of the term mental toughness and if mental toughness exists as a valid construct it may on occasion be maladaptive. Evidence to support this contention is derived from a study of overtraining behaviors and mental toughness by Tibbert (2013). She reported that "the MT attributes of mental self-concept and task familiarity displayed moderate curvilinear correlations with sport-specific recovery scales of the RESTQ-Sport. The curvilinear correlations reflect decreasing recovery at the highest levels of MT. The results suggest that some attributes of MT may relate to increased ability to recover whereas other attributes are associated with lower recovery (p.2-3). Arguably mental toughness is more closely linked with goal fixedness rather than adaptability and a flexible mindset, attributes which are central to resilience.

Measurement 
Two instruments have been developed and validated since 2009. Gucciardi and colleagues validated the American Football Mental Toughness Inventory (AFMTI), while Sheard and Golby validated the Sports Mental Toughness Questionnaire (SMTQ).  The MTQ48 pre dates these by some seven years. The factor structure of the MTQ48 has been supported by an independent research grouping led by Horsburgh (2009). Dr Lee Crust, University of Lincoln, compared the SMTQ with the MTQ 48 and concluded "Both instruments appear to tap the core components of MT but the MTQ48 seemingly provides a more comprehensive measure".

The MTQ48 questionnaire has demonstrable criterion related, construct and content validity. Reliability has been assessed by numerous independent researchers and it has clearly demonstrable internal consistency and test-retest reliability. All component scales exceed 0.70 and the overall measure has a reliability in excess of 0.90.  Nevertheless, both the construct validity and the psychometric properties of this test have been questioned by  Andersen (2011).

Several other instruments have purported to measure mental toughness, but research has called their validity into question. For example, the Performance Profile Inventory (PPI) developed by Jim Loehr used seven subscales to compute a mental toughness score.  The Mental Toughness Inventory (MTI) developed by Middleton and colleagues measures mental toughness using 12 subscales and appears to show strong theoretical evidence for its formation. However, construct validation has only been performed with a narrow sample of athletes, leaving its psychometric properties up for debate.

Sports and Mental Toughness 
Mental Toughness is an attribute that all athletes must have if they want to succeed in their given sport. Learning mental toughness at a young age(preferably during adolescence) can be vital to the success of one later in their sports career. Without mental toughness, one cannot be successful in the sports world. Professional athletes such as Tom Brady, Kobe Bryant, and Michael Jordan have had some of the best mental toughness there is. This allows them to get through the tough times and keep going when they face challenges. Learning how to be mentally tough at a young age gives one an advantage over all of their opponents. Mental toughness helps athletes cope with the ups and downs of sports. Researchers have found that mental toughness can correlate directly with performance-based outcomes such as levels of effort, nervousness, and performing at the highest ability.

In more recent times, mental toughness is being recognized more and more for how important it is due to the benefits an athlete gains by being mentally tough. It is likely that children and adolescents with a high degree of mental toughness achieve better competitive outcomes, have more positive experiences in sports, and are much more set for the rest of their lives by obtaining this skill. Mental toughness can directly lead to thriving and being in a good mental health scenario.

See also

 Psychological resilience
 Stress management
 Hardiness
 Resourcefulness

References 

Sports terminology
Personality theories
Positive psychology